Vlado Šmit (Serbian Cyrillic: Владо Шмит; born 6 April 1980) is a Serbian professional football manager and former player.

Club career
Born in Sremska Mitrovica, Šmit made his senior debut with Vrbas in the 1997–98 season, helping the club win promotion to the Second League of FR Yugoslavia. He then spent one year at Vojvodina, failing to make any appearance for their first squad. Afterwards, Šmit moved back to his former club Vrbas, scoring once in 17 league appearances during the 1999–2000 season.

In summer 2000, Šmit switched to Milicionar, making his First League of FR Yugoslavia debut in the 2000–01 season. He then spent six months with Železnik, before moving on loan to Italian club Bologna in January 2002. After a six-month period, Šmit signed a four-year contract with Bologna in the summer of 2002. He subsequently played at Serie A and Serie B level with Atalanta, Pescara and Treviso. In August 2009, after spending two months without a team following Treviso's exclusion from professional football, Šmit accepted an offer to join newly promoted Serie B side Gallipoli. He eventually switched to SPAL in January 2010.

In summer 2012, Šmit moved to Slovenia and signed with Triglav Kranj. He spent the following six seasons with the club, collecting 111 league appearances and scoring 13 goals in the process.

International career
Šmit has represented FR Yugoslavia at both the under-18 and under-21 levels in UEFA competitions.

Statistics

Notes

References

External links
 PrvaLiga profile
 
 
 

1980 births
Living people
Sportspeople from Sremska Mitrovica
Serbian footballers
Serbian expatriate footballers
Association football fullbacks
Treviso F.B.C. 1993 players
A.S.D. Gallipoli Football 1909 players
Atalanta B.C. players
Bologna F.C. 1909 players
Cagliari Calcio players
Delfino Pescara 1936 players
Expatriate footballers in Italy
Expatriate footballers in Slovenia
First League of Serbia and Montenegro players
FK Milicionar players
FK Vojvodina players
FK Vrbas players
FK Železnik players
NK Triglav Kranj players
Serbia and Montenegro under-21 international footballers
Serbian expatriate sportspeople in Italy
Serbian expatriate sportspeople in Slovenia
Serie A players
Serie B players
Slovenian PrvaLiga players
Slovenian Second League players
S.P.A.L. players
Serbian football managers
Expatriate football managers in Slovenia
Serbian expatriate football managers